Simione Kuruvoli (born 2 January 1999) is a Fijian rugby union player, currently playing for the . His preferred position is scrum-half.

Professional career
Kuruvoli was named in the Fijian Drua squad for the 2022 Super Rugby Pacific season. Kuruvoli is a Fiji international, having made his debut against Georgia in 2020.

References

External links
itsrugby.co.uk Profile

1999 births
Living people
Fijian rugby union players
Fiji international rugby union players
Rugby union scrum-halves
Fijian Drua players